The Town of Lochbuie is a statutory town located in Weld and Adams counties in the U.S. state of Colorado. The town population was 4,726 at the 2010 United States Census.

Geography
Lochbuie is located at  (40.009864, -104.708080).

According to the United States Census Bureau, the town has a total area of 1.4 square miles (3.5 km), of which, 1.3 square miles (3.5 km) of it is land and 0.04 square miles (0.1 km) of it (1.47%) is water.

History
Lochbuie was developed in the 1960s as the Spacious Living Mobile Home Park and known as Space City until it was incorporated in 1974. The town was named Lochbuie after Lochbuie, Mull, in Scotland.

Demographics

As of the census of 2000, there were 2,049 people, 1,643 households, and 518 families residing in the town. The racial makeup of the town was 73.94% White, 0.24% African American, 0.63% Native American, 0.15% Asian, 22.69% from other races, and 2.34% from two or more races. Hispanic or Latino of any race were 35.92% of the population.

There were 643 households, out of which 43.1% had children under the age of 18 living with them, 65.8% were married couples living together, 77.0% had a female householder with no husband present, and 19.4% were non-families. 15.2% of all households were made up of individuals, and 4.8% had someone living alone who was 65 years of age or older. The average household size was 3.19 and the average family size was 3.50.

In the town, the population was spread out, with 31.0% under the age of 18, 8.7% from 18 to 24, 32.9% from 25 to 44, 19.7% from 45 to 64, and 7.7% who were 65 years of age or older. The median age was 31 years. For every 100 females, there were 110.4 males. For every 100 females age 18 and over, there were 114.2 males.

The median income for a family was $40,089. Males had a median income of $30,993 versus $28,000 for females. The per capita income for the town was $14,845. About 4.3% of families and 8.5% of the population were below the poverty line, including 10.3% of those under age 18 and 8.1% of those age 65 or over.

See also

Outline of Colorado
Index of Colorado-related articles
State of Colorado
Colorado cities and towns
Colorado municipalities
Colorado counties
Weld County, Colorado
Colorado metropolitan areas
Front Range Urban Corridor
North Central Colorado Urban Area
Denver-Aurora-Boulder, CO Combined Statistical Area
Greeley, CO Metropolitan Statistical Area

References

External links
Town of Lochbuie website
CDOT map of the Town of Lochbuie

Towns in Weld County, Colorado
Towns in Adams County, Colorado
Towns in Colorado
Denver metropolitan area